The 1925 Waratahs tour of New Zealand was a series of rugby union games undertaken by the New South Wales Teams against invitational and national teams of New Zealand.

The Queensland Rugby Union had collapsed in 1919 and would not be reborn until 1929 leaving the New South Wales Rugby Union to administer the game in Australia at the national representative level. In 1925 the New South Wales side toured New Zealand

Previously the All Blacks visited New South Wales in the 1925 tour.

Matches 
Scores and results list New South Wales' points tally first.

Notes

References
All found on link
 The Sydney Morning Herald, Monday 24 August 1925 p 5
 The Sydney Morning Herald, Thursday 27 August 1925 p 12
 The Sydney Morning Herald, Monday 31 August 1925 p 6
 The Sydney Morning Herald, Friday 4 September 1925 p 12
 The Sydney Morning Herald, Monday 7 September 1925 p 11
 The Sydney Morning Herald, Thursday 10 September 1925 p 1
 The Sydney Morning Herald, Monday 14 September 1925 p 13
 The Sydney Morning Herald, Thursday 17 September 1925 p 10
 The Sydney Morning Herald, Monday 21 September 1925 p 8
 The Sydney Morning Herald, Friday 25 September 1925 p 14

Australia
Waratahs
Australia national rugby union team tours of New Zealand
New South Wales rugby union team tours
1925 in Australian rugby union
it:Tour della Nazionale di rugby a 15 dell'Australia 1921-1925